The Canon PowerShot G7 X is a compact digital camera announced by Canon Inc. on September 15, 2014. It did not replace any model in the Canon lineup. Instead it was a new camera intended to compete with the Sony Cyber-shot DSC-RX100-series cameras. With the introduction of G7 X there were three parallel models in the Canon PowerShot G-series: G16, G1 X Mark II and G7 X.

In 2016 Canon introduced a newer model, the new Canon PowerShot G7 X Mark II with a newer DIGIC 6 processor.

Canon G7X can't change the lens

References

 DPReview

G7 X
Canon PowerShot G7 X